Kostas Christodoulou (1 January 1915 – ?) was a Greek footballer who played as a forward and a later manager.

Club career
Christodoulou started the football at PAO Dafni Athens where he competed at the left wing of the offense. In the summer of 1930 and at a very young age, he moved to Panathinaikos without the consent of his club, a very common event at the time and was punished with a one year ban from every official competition, according to the regulations at the time. He won the Athens FCA league of 1934 with the "greens". In 1936 he joined the city rivals, AEK Athens, where he played for 9 years winning 2 consecutive Panhellenic Championships, 1 Cup and 2 Athens FCA Championships, including the first domestic double in by a Greek club in 1939. He stopped football in 1945, during the events of the World War II and the Occupation, where the Greek football was inactive, at the age of 30.

International career
Christodoulou played for Greece, where he made his debut on 4 February 1934 in the 1–0 friendly win against Bulgaria at the Leoforos Alexandras Stadium, where he replaced Leonidas Andrianopoulos in the 55th minute. He was limited to 5 international appearances, four with Panathinaikos and one with AEK, due  to World War II, as he took part in Greece's last pre-war meeting on 25 March 1938, where they achieved their greatest defeat by 11–1 against Hungary in Budapest.

Managerial career
After retiring as a football player, Christodoulou coached various teams such as Proodeftiki among others.

Personal life
His younger brother, Christos was also a footballer, also on the left wing of the midfield of Panathinaikos.

Honours

Panathninaikos
Athens FCA League: 1934

AEK Athens
Panhellenic Championship: 1938–39, 1939–40
Greek Cup: 1938–39
Athens FCA League: 1940, 1946

References

External links

"The History of AEK", collective work, G.X Alexandris Publications, Athens 1996
"National Greece • March through time", V. Melecoglou-Agg. Mendrinos- T. Davelos, "Papazisis Publications", Athens 2001, ISBN 960-021-082-9
"Greek national football team 1929-2004 • 75 blue and white years, with full analytical data", Stathis Arvanitis, Kastaniotis Publications, Athens 2004, ISBN 960-033-778-0
archive of national games of Greece, Alexandros Mastrogiannopoulos for the rsssf.com
"1908-1998 Panathinaikos • 90 years of football epic", Vangelis Melecoglou-Angelos Mendrinos-Thodoris Davelos, "Trifilli AEVE publication", Athens 1999, ISBN 960-862-531-9

1915 births
Footballers from Athens
Greek footballers
Greece international footballers
Association football forwards
AEK Athens F.C. players
Panathinaikos F.C. players